Cancer Control Month is a month-long United States observance established by .

2013 edition 
(a) The president is requested to issue each year a proclamation—
(1) designating April as Cancer Control Month;
(2)  to invite each year the chief executive officers of the States, territories, and possessions of the United States to issue proclamations designating April as Cancer Control Month.
(b) Contents of Proclamations.— As part of those proclamations, the chief executive officers and president are requested to invite the medical profession, the press, and all agencies and individuals interested in a national program for the control of cancer by education and other cooperative means to unite during Cancer Control Month in a public dedication to the program and in a concerted effort to make the people of the United States aware of the need for the program.

See also 
Title 36 of the United States Code
National Coalition for Cancer Survivorship

External links 
36 U.S.C. § 101 from the United States Government Printing Office
36 U.S.C. § 101 from Cornell Law School

References

April observances
Observances in the United States by presidential proclamation